Čulo is a Croatian surname found in Croatia and Bosnia and Herzegovina. Notable people with the surname include:

 (born 1980), German church musician and composer

References

Croatian surnames